Heino Puuste (born 7 September 1955 in Lagedi) is a retired Estonian javelin thrower who represented the USSR and later Estonia. He finished fourth at both the 1980 Summer Olympics and the 1983 World Championships, and won a silver medal at the 1982 European Championships. He also won bronze medals at the Universiade in 1979 and 1981. On May 6, 1983, he threw at Birmingham a new Soviet record of 94.20 meters, eclipsing the old mark (and former world record) of 93.80 by Jānis Lūsis. This record was never beaten as increasing distances and frequent flat or ambiguous landings prompted a change to a new javelin design, effective starting in 1986.
Puuste later became an athletics coach, most notably coaching the 2005 javelin throw world champion Andrus Värnik.

Personal life
Heino Puuste's father-in-law was basketball player Ilmar Kullam.

References
 

1955 births
Living people
Estonian male javelin throwers
Soviet male javelin throwers
People from Rae Parish
Athletes (track and field) at the 1980 Summer Olympics
Olympic athletes of the Soviet Union
Estonian athletics coaches
European Athletics Championships medalists
Universiade medalists in athletics (track and field)
Goodwill Games medalists in athletics
Universiade bronze medalists for the Soviet Union
Recipients of the Order of the White Star, 4th Class
Medalists at the 1979 Summer Universiade
Medalists at the 1981 Summer Universiade
Competitors at the 1986 Goodwill Games